Asunafo North is one of the constituencies represented in the Parliament of Ghana. It elects one Member of Parliament (MP) by the first past the post system of election

Members of Parliament

Boundaries
The Asunafo North constituency was one of the constituencies created prior to the 1992 Ghanaian parliamentary election. This constituency was originally located in the Brong-Ahafo Region, now in the Ahafo Region of Ghana.

See also
List of Ghana Parliament constituencies

References 

Parliamentary constituencies in Ahafo Region